Pleiocarpamine is a natural anticholinergic alkaloid.

References

Anticholinergic alkaloids
Indole alkaloids
Methyl esters
Quinolizidine alkaloids